The stone coffin of Tet el Bad is located in the village of Ollei, Ngarchelong State, Palau.

Site description 
The ornately carved stone coffin resides in the village of Ollei on the village chief's stone meeting platform.

World Heritage Status 
This site was added to the UNESCO World Heritage Tentative List on August 26, 2004 in the Cultural category.

Notes 

Monuments and memorials in Palau
Ngarchelong
 Megalithic monuments